Robert Edwards Carter Stearns  (1 February 1827, Boston – 27 July 1909, Los Angeles) was an American conchologist.

Robert Stearns was passionate about natural history in his youth. Later he specialised in conchology, especially that of the West Coast of the United States. He was a member of the Fisheries Commission (1882–1884) and Secretary of the University of California (Berkeley) (1874–1882). He became Assistant Curator of Molluscs at the National Museum of Natural History (1885–1892). Stearns married Mary Ann Libby on 28 March 1850. They had one child, a daughter.

References
Biography by Gerald J. Rosenzweig in Smithsonian Institution Archives.
Robert Tucker Abbott (1974). American Malacologists. A National Register of Professional and Amateur Malacologists and Private Shell Collectors and Biographies of Early American Mollusk Workers Born Between 1618 and 1900, American Malacologists (Falls Church, Virginia) : iv + 494 p. )

American malacologists
1909 deaths
1827 births
Scientists from Boston
19th-century American zoologists
University of California, Berkeley people
Smithsonian Institution people